Emma Harriet Baker  is a British professor of clinical pharmacology and consultant physician in internal medicine at St George's Hospital, London. She has a specialist interest in people who have multiple medical conditions at the same time and take several medications, with a particular focus on lung disease. She is director of the UK's first BSc in clinical pharmacology, clinical vice president of the British Pharmacological Society and training programme director at Health Education England.

Baker was executive editor of the British Journal of Clinical Pharmacology for 10 years. Her research led to the publication of The Top 100 Drugs: Clinical Pharmacology and Practical Prescribing (2015 and 2019) after identifying the most important and commonly prescribed drugs in the NHS.

During the first wave of the COVID-19 pandemic in the UK, she was a frontline healthcare professional on respiratory wards. She is listed as a principal investigator in the Cambridge COVID-19 trials.

After being elected best teacher 1998–2002 by her medical students, her hands feature alongside those of Edward Jenner, John Hunter and others in the sculpture titled "Handing on Skills, Ideas and Ideals", unveiled in 2002 at St George's to celebrate its 250-year anniversary of medical training.

Medical career

Emma H. Baker graduated from the University of Edinburgh in 1988. During a junior work placement at Salford's Hope Hospital, she met Leslie Turnberg (later president of the Royal College of Physicians), who persuaded her to enter an academic career and pursue a doctorate. She subsequently earned her PhD in 1996 from Manchester University.

She developed a specialist interest in people who have multiple medical conditions at the same time and take several medications, with a particular focus on lung disease. Before being appointed consultant in internal medicine at St George's Hospital in 2000, she was one of professor Joe Collier's lecturers.

She became the director of the UK's first BSc in clinical pharmacology. She pointed out in an interview with the British Medical Journal in 2020, that not doing a BSc as a medical student herself reduced her choices in medicine. She is also clinical vice president of the British Pharmacological Society and is Health Education England's training programme director.

Writing
For a decade she was an executive editor of the British Journal of Clinical Pharmacology.

Her research led to identifying 100 most important and commonly prescribed drugs in the NHS. After being asked by students to provide a concise and practical collection of these medicines, she co-authored The Top 100 Drugs: Clinical Pharmacology and Practical Prescribing, the first edition appearing in 2015 and a second in 2019.

Her research has also included looking at the effect of raised glucose levels in people with COPD.

COVID-19
During the first wave of the COVID-19 pandemic in the UK, she was a frontline healthcare professional on respiratory wards. In December 2020 she organised her clinical pharmacology BSc students, in their second year of university, to be trained to perform mass COVID-19 testing for fellow students to allow them to go home for Christmas. She is listed as a principal investigator in the Cambridge COVID-19 trials.

Awards and honours
Undergraduate students at St George's elected Baker as best teacher for 1998 to 2002. As a result, her hands feature alongside those of Edward Jenner's, John Hunter's, Robert Boyd's, Joe Collier's and others in an English walnut sculpture by Elona Bennett titled "Handing on Skills, Ideas and Ideals", unveiled in the presence of the Queen on 2 December 2002 at St George's to celebrate 250 years of medical training at the medical school.

In 2003 she received the National Teaching Fellowship of the Higher Education Academy and has received further undergraduate teaching prizes from her students.

Selected publications

Books
 (Co-author)
 (Co-author)
 (Co-author)

Articles
 (Co-author)
 (Co-author)
 (Co-author)
 (Co-author)

References

External links

Living people
Year of birth unknown
Academic journal editors
Fellows of the Royal College of Physicians
Place of birth missing (living people)
British pharmacologists
Alumni of the University of Edinburgh
Women physicians
Physicians of St George's Hospital
Alumni of the University of Manchester
Medical writers
Women pharmacologists
British women scientists
Clinical pharmacologists
Year of birth missing (living people)